Soyuz MS-15 was a Soyuz spaceflight launched on 25 September 2019, transporting two members of the Expedition 61 crew and a short duration visiting crew member to the International Space Station. Soyuz MS-15 was the 143rd flight of a Soyuz spacecraft with a crew. It was the last flight of Soyuz-FG launcher before its replacement by the Soyuz-2 in the crewed spaceflight role, and also the last launch from Site 1/5 (Gagarin's Start) before its modernisation to support the new Soyuz-2 rocket. The crew consisted of a Russian commander, an American flight engineer, and the first Emirati astronaut. To celebrate this event, pictures of the Soyuz launcher and of Hazza Al Mansouri were projected on Burj Khalifa, the tallest building in the world.

Crew

Backup crew

References 

Crewed Soyuz missions
Spacecraft launched in 2019
2019 in Russia
Spacecraft launched by Soyuz-FG rockets
Spacecraft which reentered in 2020